The Junior Presidents Cup is a junior team golf competition between the United States and an International team representing the rest of the world excluding Europe. It is based around the Presidents Cup and is run by the PGA Tour and American Junior Golf Association. The inaugural event took place at the Plainfield Country Club, Edison, New Jersey on September 25 and 26, 2017. The United States have won all three events that have been contested.

Qualification
The teams consist of 12 junior boys. Participants must be at least 12 years old at the start of the event and must be 18 or younger and have not yet graduated high school as of January 1 of the year of the contest. Players must be amateurs who have not yet started college and are not members of a competitive collegiate golf program. Members of each team mostly qualify through a ranking system, the United States team based on the Rolex AJGA Rankings, and the International Team based on the World Amateur Golf Rankings.

In 2017 11 members of each team were selected based on the rankings on August 3 with the final place being given to the leading player in the rankings, not already qualified, on September 6. In 2019 all 12 members of the team were selected based on the rankings on September 5. In 2022 10 members of each team were selected based on the rankings on August 19, with one player selected by the team captain and the final place being given to the leading player in the rankings, not already qualified, on September 8.

Format
The event is held over two days, with six fourballs and six foursomes matches on the first day, and twelve singles matches on the second day.

Results

Teams

United States
2022: Johnnie Clark, Ethan Gao, Nicholas Gross, Henry Guan, Bryan Kim, Carson Kim, Jackson Koivun, Eric Lee, P. J. Maybank, Matt Moloney, Aaron Pounds, Preston Stout
2019: Stephen Campbell Jr., Canon Claycomb, Jack Heath, Benjamin James, Maxwell Moldovan, Brett Roberts, Vishnu Sadagopan, Ian Siebers, Preston Summerhays, Michael Thorbjornsen, Jackson Van Paris, Alexander Yang
2017: Garrett Barber, Akshay Bhatia, Jacob Bridgeman, Prescott Butler, Canon Claycomb, Noah Goodwin, Cole Hammer, Joe Highsmith, Eugene Hong, Turner Hosch, William Mouw, Trent Phillips

International
2022: Joshua Bai, Wenyi Ding, Jayden Ford, Jeffrey Guan, Jonathan Xavier Hartono, Pongsapak Laopakdee, Rayhan Abdul Latief, Aldrich Potgieter, Yurav Premlall, Chris Richards Jr., Juan Carlos Velasquez, Anson Yeo
2019: Jordan Duminy, Joshua Greer, Bo Jin, Christo Lamprecht, Lee Jang-hyun, Lin Chuan-tai, Jayden Schaper, Kartik Sharma, Samuel Simpson, Karl Vilips, Martin Vorster, Andi Xu
2017: Joshua Armstrong, Luca Filippi, Garrick Higgo, Christo Lamprecht, Fred Lee, Sean Maruyama, Naraajie Emerald Ramadhan, Jayden Schaper, Rayhan Thomas, Karl Vilips, Atiruj Winaicharoenchai, Wocheng Ye

See also
Junior Ryder Cup

References

External links
Coverage on Presidents Cup website

Junior golf tournaments
Team golf tournaments
Presidents Cup